RightSignature is a web and mobile e-signature service provided by Citrix Systems.

History 

RightSignature was privately launched in early 2008 and was first promoted at the Southern California VentureNet conference where RightSignature won first place.

Major competitions include EchoSign and DocuSign.

In October 2014, RightSignature was acquired by Citrix Systems, where it will be added to its ShareFile service.

References

External links 
 Company Website

Citrix Systems
Software companies based in California
Defunct software companies of the United States
2014 mergers and acquisitions